Bulloo Downs Station is a pastoral lease that operates as a cattle station.

Location
Bulloo Downs shares boundaries with Mount Vernon, Sylvania, Prairie Downs, Weelarrana and Tangadee Stations as well as areas of vacant crown land.

Description
The station encompasses part of the Ashburton River and is made up of undulating slate and basalt country that support a range of native grasses. There are areas of open flats covered in salt bush and blue bush and stands of mulga. The recommended carrying capacity is 2,590 cattle.

History
In 1928 the property was put up for auction by the then owners Messrs J. and L. Smith who also owned Ethel Creek, Bolinda and Illgarrarie Stations. The property had a five-room homestead, store, workers' quarters, stable, one outcamp and ten sets of stockyards. Stock were watered by pools along the river and 29 wells most of which were equipped with mills and troughing.

The property was passed in at auction and remained unsold in 1929. The property was advertised again in 1940, again unsuccessfully, with the Smiths still owning it in 1944.

In 1951 the owners of Bullo surrendered an  portion of land. In 1952 an  portion of the northern ends of Bulloo Downs and Weelarrana Stations were opened up for leasing by the Department of Lands and Surveys.

An estimated 20,000 feral donkeys were roaming on Bulloo Downs and neighbouring Prairie Downs Stations in 1957.

See also
List of ranches and stations

References

Pastoral leases in Western Australia
Stations (Australian agriculture)
Mid West (Western Australia)